In Japanese art, a  ('optique picture') is a print designed using graphical perspective techniques and viewed through a convex lens to produce a three-dimensional effect. The term derives from the French .

Perspective boxes first appeared in Renaissance Europe and were popular until superseded by the stereoscope in the mid-19th century.  The Dutch brought the first such device to Japan in the 1640s as a gift to the shōgun.  The devices became popular in Japan only after the Chinese popularized them in Japan about 1758, after which they began to influence Japanese artists.

The artist Maruyama Ōkyo (1733–95) made serious study of imported perspective techniques and applied them to his painting.  He gained an interest in making ukiyo-e prints through the artist Utagawa Toyoharu, who produced  'floating pictures' using linear perspective techniques.  Ōkyo began making  prints for viewing through a convex lens: .  Ōkyo later dismissed his , perhaps because their subjects were of kabuki and the pleasure quarters and thus considered of low artistic value.  Prints by artists such as Utamaro and Masanobu depict people enjoying .

References

Works cited

 
 
 
 

Japanese art
Ukiyo-e genres